Selahabad District may refer to:
 Salehabad District (Ilam Province)
 Salehabad District (Razavi Khorasan Province)